Mantes-la-Ville is a commune in the Yvelines department in the Île-de-France region in north-central France. It is located in the western suburbs of Paris  from the center.

Mantes-la-Ville is located at the confluence of the Seine and the Vaucouleurs. The Paris–Rouen rail line separates Mantes-la-Ville from the larger commune of Mantes-la-Jolie. The A13 autoroute to Normandy also passes through Mantes-la-Ville.

Population

Inhabitants are called Mantevillois. Approximately one-third of the town's population is Muslim.

Economy
Mantes-la-Ville is the headquarters of two world-renowned makers of wind instruments: Henri Selmer and Buffet Crampon.

Eduard Beaugnier et Cie, another saxophone manufacturer, was also based in Mantes until the company closed down in the early 1970s. Beaugnier manufactured saxophones under their own name, and also as "stencils" for other companies under names such as Noblet, Vito and Revere. Though not as well known as the instruments of Henri Selmer, Beaugnier instruments have a good reputation amongst saxophone enthusiasts. Another high-quality saxophone manufacturer based in Mantes was Dolnet, whose factory closed down in the late 1970s.

There is an industrial park on the old site of Cellophane.

Twin towns

 Chigwell, Essex, England
 Hillingdon, Greater London, England
 Neunkirchen, Saarland, Germany

Transport
Mantes-la-Ville is served by Mantes-Station station, an interchange station on the Transilien Paris-Saint-Lazare and Transilien Paris-Montparnasse suburban rail lines.

Culture
The Mantes-la-Ville Orchestral Ensemble is led by Jean-Luc Fillon

Education 
There are 15 communal primary schools. There are also two junior high schools Les Plaisances (opened in 1968) and de la Vaucouleurs (has 615 students as of 2016), and one vocational high school, Lycée Camille Claudel (des métiers de l'accompagnement aux personnes, du commerce et de l'hôtellerie-restauration).

Universities:
 ISTY
 Versailles Saint-Quentin-en-Yvelines University

See also
Communes of the Yvelines department

References

External links

Official website 

Communes of Yvelines